Real Zaragoza Deportivo Aragón is the reserve team of Real Zaragoza, a Spanish football club based in Zaragoza, in the autonomous community of Aragon. Founded in 1958, currently plays in Segunda Federación – Group 3, holding home matches at Ciudad Deportiva del Real Zaragoza, with a capacity of 2,500 seats.

History 
In the 2016–17 season the club won Tercera División, Group 17 and promoted to the Segunda División B.

Club names
Real Zaragoza Club Deportivo Aficionados - (1958–59)
Juventud Club de Fútbol - (1959–62)
Club Deportivo Aragón - (1964–66)
Aragón Club de Fútbol - (1966–70)
Deportivo Aragón - (1970–91)
Real Zaragoza "B" - (1991–2015)
Real Zaragoza Deportivo Aragón - (2015–)

Season to season
As Real Zaragoza CD Aficionados

As Juventud CF

As Deportivo Aragón – Aragón CF

Merged with Zaragoza

1 season in Segunda División
24 seasons in Segunda División B
1 season in Segunda Federación
29 seasons in Tercera División
1 season in Tercera División RFEF

Honours
Tercera División: (6) 1982–83, 1995–96, 2006–07, 2013–14, 2015–16, 2016–17

Current squad
.

From Youth Academy

Out on loan

Current technical staff

References

External links
  
 Futbolme team profile 

Real Zaragoza
Spanish reserve football teams
Football clubs in Aragon
Association football clubs established in 1958
Sport in Zaragoza
1958 establishments in Spain
Segunda División clubs